Shallow Brook is a tributary of Devils Brook in central New Jersey in the United States.

Shallow Brook flows generally parallel to the Devils Brook, draining a similar area in Middlesex and Mercer counties.

Course

Accessibility
Shallow Brook is easily accessible through road crossings and the Devils Brook, its parent brook.

See also
List of rivers of New Jersey

References

External links
USGS Coordinates in Google Maps

Tributaries of the Raritan River
Rivers of New Jersey
Rivers of Middlesex County, New Jersey
Rivers of Mercer County, New Jersey